An acronym for FILe Generator and Editor, FILGE was a command-oriented text editor created by CompuServe in the early 1970s. Its many commands were preceded by a slash (/) character. For example, if a text file contained the line:

The quick brown fox jumps over the lazy dog

The word 'fox' could be replaced with 'wolf' using this command:

/c/fox/wolf

To see the result of the edit, the user could type:

/p

and in this case, would see

The quick brown wolf jumps over the lazy dog

There were many other commands, which later including a repeating capability, which allow significant file manipulations to be performed without the need to write special programs. FILGE was replaced by screen-oriented WYSIWYG editors.

CompuServe
Text editors